Mahadeo may refer to:

 Shiva, a Hindu God
 Mahadeo Hills in Madhya Pradesh, India
 Mahadeo Deole, Mayor of Mumbai (2002 - February 2005)
 Mahadeo Govind Ranade, Indian social reformer
 Mahadeorao Sukaji Shivankar, Indian politician